Ingrid Kristina Nilsson (née Karlsson; born 1965) is a Swedish politician and former member of the Riksdag, the national legislature. A member of the Social Democratic Party, she represented Västernorrland County between October 2010 and September 2022.

Nilsson is the daughter of factory worker Åke Karlsson and municipal worker Adéle Karlsson (née Backman). She studied nursing. She worked for the in county council in Västernorrland County. She has been a member of the municipal council in Örnsköldsvik Municipality since 2018. She had previously been a member of the municipal council from 2002 to 2015.

References

1965 births
Living people
Members of the Riksdag 2010–2014
Members of the Riksdag 2014–2018
Members of the Riksdag 2018–2022
Members of the Riksdag from the Social Democrats
People from Örnsköldsvik Municipality
Women members of the Riksdag
21st-century Swedish women politicians